Mézières-sur-Seine (literally Mézières on Seine) is a commune in the Yvelines department in the Île-de-France region in north-central France.

The name of the commune comes from the Latin word: maceria, meaning walls.

Sites of interest
Saint-Nicolas church, built in the 13th century in Gothic style. A choir was added since the 17th century.  It is a listed monument since 1931.

See also
Communes of the Yvelines department

References

Communes of Yvelines